Major-General John Edward Utterson-Kelso  (1893–1972) was a British Army officer.

Military career
Educated at Haileybury College, Utterson-Kelso entered the Royal Military College, Sandhurst, from where he was commissioned into the Royal Scots Fusiliers on 4 September 1912 He saw service during the First World War for which he was awarded the Military Cross (MC), and, in September 1917, received a bar to his MC, and another one later, with the bar's citation reading:

He was also wounded five times, mentioned in dispatches and awarded the Distinguished Service Order (DSO). The citation for his DSO reads:

He was later awarded a bar to his DSO, with the bar's citation reading:

Utterson-Kelso became an instructor at the Small Arms School in 1928, commander of the Lines of Communications Troops in Palestine and Transjordan in 1936 and commanding officer of the 2nd Battalion, the Devonshire Regiment in 1937. He went on to be commander 131st (Surrey) Infantry Brigade in November 1939 and landed in France on 3 April 1940 to join the British Expeditionary Force (BEF). After taking part in the Dunkirk evacuation, he served as General Officer Commanding 47th (London) Infantry Division from April 1941 until April 1942. While in that position he became the first divisional GOC to incorporate battle drill into the training of units and higher formations.

He then served as head of the infantry branch of the Directorate of Military Training at Headquarters Home Forces until January 1944. He became General Officer Commanding 76th Infantry Division in March 1944 before returning to his role as General Officer Commanding 47th (London) Infantry Division in September 1944; he remained in that role until the end of the war.

References

Bibliography

External links
Generals of World War II

|-
 

|-

1893 births
1972 deaths
British Army major generals
Companions of the Order of the Bath
Companions of the Distinguished Service Order
Officers of the Order of the British Empire
Recipients of the Military Cross
Royal Scots Fusiliers officers
British Army generals of World War II
Devonshire Regiment officers
British Army personnel of World War I
People educated at Haileybury and Imperial Service College
Graduates of the Royal Military College, Sandhurst